Serbia participated in the Junior Eurovision Song Contest 2019 in Gliwice, Poland with the song "Podigni glas (Raise Your Voice)" performed by Darija Vračević. Radio Television of Serbia (RTS) was responsible for selecting their entry for the contest.

Background

In last year's contest Serbia got a nineteenth place with Bojana Radovanović and a song called "Svet".

Before Junior Eurovision
On 16 September 2019, it was announced that Darija Vračević would represent the country in Gliwice, Poland with a song called "Podigni glas".

Artist and song information

Darija Vračević
Darija Vračević (born 27 October 2007) is a Serbian singer, actress and voice artist  born in Belgrade. She participated in Pinkove Zvezdice in 2018–19, and represented Serbia at the Junior Eurovision Song Contest 2019 with the song "Podigni glas".

Podigni glas (Raise Your Voice)
"Podigni glas" (lit. Raise your voice) is a song by Serbian singer Darija Vračević. It represented Serbia at the Junior Eurovision Song Contest 2019.

At Junior Eurovision
During the opening ceremony and the running order draw which both took place on 18 November 2019, Serbia was drawn to perform nineteenth (last) on 24 November 2019, following Albania.

Voting

Detailed voting results

References

Junior Eurovision Song Contest
Serbia
2019